The Uluguru violet-backed sunbird (Anthreptes neglectus) is a species of bird in the family Nectariniidae. It is found in forests in eastern Kenya, eastern Tanzania (including the Uluguru Mountains, the basis for its common name) and north-eastern Mozambique. It is part of the violet-backed sunbird superspecies.

References

Uluguru violet-backed sunbird
Birds of East Africa
Uluguru violet-backed sunbird
Taxa named by Oscar Neumann
Taxonomy articles created by Polbot